The 1928 Dayton Flyers football team was an American football team that represented the University of Dayton as a member of the Ohio Athletic Conference during the 1928 college football season. In its sixth season under head coach Harry Baujan, the team compiled a 6–3 record.

Schedule

References

Dayton
Dayton Flyers football seasons
Dayton Flyers football